Shihāb al-Dīn Abū 'l-Abbās Aḥmad ibn ‘Alī ibn Aḥmad ‘Abd Allāh al-Fazārī al-Shāfiʿī better known by the epithet al-Qalqashandī (1355 or 1356 – 1418), was a medieval Egyptian encyclopedist, polymath and mathematician. A native of the Nile Delta, he became a Scribe of the Scroll (Katib al-Darj), or clerk of the Mamluk chancery in Cairo, Egypt. His magnum opus is the voluminous administrative encyclopedia Ṣubḥ al-Aʿshá.

Ṣubḥ al-aʿshā

Ṣubḥ al-Aʿshá fī Ṣināʿat al-Inshāʾ ('The Dawn of the Blind' or 'Daybreak for the Night-Blind regarding the Composition of Chancery Documents'); a fourteen-volume encyclopedia completed in 1412, is an administrative manual on geography, political history, natural history, zoology, mineralogy, cosmography, and time measurement.  Based on the Masālik al-abṣār fī mamālik al-amṣar of Shihab al-Umari, it has been called "one of the final expressions of the genre of Arabic administrative literature". Selections on "Seats of Government " and "Regulations of the Kingdom " from Early Islam to the Mamluks' have been published separately. 

The Ṣubḥ al-aʿshā was cited by David Kahn as the first published discussion of the substitution and transposition of ciphers, and the first description of a polyalphabetic cipher, in which each plaintext letter is assigned more than one substitution. The exposition on cryptanalysis included the use of tables of letter frequencies and sets of letters which cannot occur together in one word.

Kahn therefore cited it as the first work in human history that described cryptology, because it described both cryptography and cryptanalysis. Al-Qalqashandi quoted the text relevant to cryptology from the work of Ibn al-Durayhim (1312–1361) that was once considered lost. Later discoveries in Istanbul‟s Sulaimaniyyah Ottoman Archives did not just find the work by Ibn Duraihim, but also works of al-Kindi in the 9th century that is now considered the oldest work on cryptology.

References

Sources

External links

Further reading
Christian and Jewish Religious Dignitaries in Mamluk Egypt and Syria: Qalqashandi's Information on their Hierarchy, Titulature, and Appointment (I &II) International Journal of Middle East Studies, 3:1, 3:2 (1972) 

1350s births
1418 deaths
14th-century Arabs
15th-century Arabs
14th-century Egyptian people
14th-century mathematicians
15th-century Egyptian people
15th-century mathematicians
Egyptian encyclopedists
Egyptian scientists
Medieval Egyptian mathematicians
Scholars from the Mamluk Sultanate
Encyclopedists of the medieval Islamic world
Pre-19th-century cryptographers